All-time FC Cincinnati roster may refer to:

 All-time FC Cincinnati (2016–2018) roster
 All-time FC Cincinnati (MLS) roster